Ludwig van Beethoven's Opus 1 is a set of three piano trios (written for piano, violin, and cello), first performed in 1795 in the house of Prince Lichnowsky, to whom they are dedicated. The trios were published in 1795.

Despite the Op. 1 designation, these trios were not Beethoven's first published compositions; this 
distinction belongs rather to his Dressler Variations for keyboard (WoO 63). Clearly he recognized the Op. 1  compositions as the earliest ones he had produced that were substantial enough (and marketable enough) to fill out a first major publication to introduce his style of writing to the musical public.

Op. 1 No. 1 - Piano Trio No. 1 in E-flat major
 Allegro (E-flat major), 
 Adagio cantabile (A-flat major), 
 Scherzo. Allegro assai (E-flat major, with  trio in A-flat major), 
 Finale. Presto (E-flat major), 

The first movement opens with an ascending arpeggiated figure (a so-called Mannheim Rocket, like that opening the first movement of the composer's own Piano Sonata no 1, Opus 2 no 1),

Op. 1 No. 2 - Piano Trio No. 2 in G major
 Adagio,  - Allegro vivace,  (G major)
 Largo con espressione (E major), 
 Scherzo. Allegro (G major, with a trio in B minor), 
 Finale. Presto (G major),

Op. 1 No. 3 - Piano Trio No. 3 in C minor
 Allegro con brio (C minor), 
 Andante cantabile con Variazioni (E-flat major), 
 Minuetto. Quasi allegro (C minor, with a trio in C major), 
 Finale. Prestissimo (C minor, concluding in C major), 

Unlike the other piano trios in this opus, the third trio does not have a scherzo as its third movement but a minuet instead.

This third piano trio was later reworked by Beethoven into the C minor string quintet, Op. 104.

References

External links
 
Performance of Piano Trio No. 1 by the Claremont Trio from the Isabella Stewart Gardner Museum in MP3 format
Performance of Piano Trio No. 3, I Allegro con brio

Piano Trio 01
1793 compositions
Music with dedications